Ford Motor Co. v. Montana Eighth Judicial Dist., 592 U.S. ___ (2021), was a U.S. Supreme Court case involving personal jurisdiction of a state court in product liability lawsuits. The case, consolidated with Ford Motor Co. v. Bandemer, involved two product liability lawsuits brought against the Ford Motor Company at the state level related to two drivers' injuries in separate accidents involving Ford's vehicles in Montana and Minnesota. Ford challenged the lawsuits as the vehicles in question were manufactured elsewhere so the states did not have personal jurisdiction over that conduct. The Supreme Court ruled in a 8–0 decision that because, under the Due Process Clause, the claims "arise out of or relate to" Ford's business and marketing activities, those activities gave sufficient claim for the states to assert personal jurisdiction over the liability lawsuits.

Background
Two 2015 accidents involving Ford vehicles were at the basis of the case. In Montana, an accident involving a separated tire tread on a Ford Explorer caused the death of the driver, Markkaya Gullett. In Minnesota, Adam Bandemer had rear-ended a snow plot in a Ford Crown Victoria, causing him to end up in a ditch, but the car's air bags failed to deploy, leading to him to suffer a brain injury.

In both cases, the parties (Gullett's estate and Bandemer) filed suit against Ford over defects in their products in their respect state courts. Ford sought a motion to dismiss both cases on the basis that the state courts lacked personal jurisdiction. Ford argued that the cars themselves were designed and manufactured in other states or in Canada, and only by right of sale ended up in those states. Because of that, there was no relevant connection between their activities of designing and manufacturing the car and the accidents in the states for the state courts to have jurisdiction. These motions were rejected by state district courts and through appeals to both the Montana Supreme Court and Minnesota Supreme Court, upholding lower court rulings that Ford's activities include purposeful promotions and sales of vehicles to their states' residents. Under the Due Process Clause, the courts ruled that the plaintiffs' claims "arise out of or relate to" Ford's business activities in states, thus allowing the state courts to hear these cases.

Supreme Court
Ford petitioned the results of their exhausted state appeals to the Supreme Court in 2019, asking the question if the "arise out of or relate to" requirement of the Due Process Clause is met even when none of their state activities caused the claims in the plaintiffs' cases. The Supreme Court certified both cases in January 2020, consolidating them under the Montana petition. Oral arguments were heard on October 7, 2020; this was a case that followed the death of Justice Ruth Bader Ginsburg but prior to the appointment of Amy Coney Barrett as her replacement, and Barrett did not participate on further deliberations for the case.

The Court issued its 8–0 decision on March 25, 2021, which upheld that the states' courts did have personal jurisdiction over Ford, allowing the cases to move forward. Justice Elena Kagan wrote the majority opinion and was joined by Chief Justice John Roberts and Justices Stephen Breyer, Sonia Sotomayor, and Brett Kavanaugh. Kagan wrote that "By every means imaginable — among them, billboards, TV and radio spots, print ads and direct mail — Ford urges Montanans and Minnesotans to buy its vehicles, including (at all relevant times) Explorers and Crown Victorias", and among other numerous business activities, Ford "encourage[s] Montanans and Minnesotans to become lifelong Ford drivers." Thus, the states had ample reason to find that the claim made "arise out of or relate to" Ford's activities, as established by the Due Process Clause.

Justice Samuel Alito wrote a concurring opinion, while Justice Neil Gorsuch also wrote a concurring opinion, joined by Justice Clarence Thomas. Both concurrences agreed with the net outcome of the case but stressed that the majority's test on the phrase "arise out of or relate to" may give rise to further complexity in trying to evaluate future liability cases. Gorsuch singled out the court's continued reliance on International Shoe Co. v. Washington as outdated and favoring corporations. Gorsuch wrote that "Nearly 80 years removed from ''International Shoe'', corporations continue to receive special jurisdictional protections in the name of the Constitution. Less clear is why." Gorsuch favored a simpler "But-for" causation test instead, noting that the majority's decision might have a disparate impact on small businesses.

References

External links 
 

2021 in United States case law
United States Supreme Court cases of the Roberts Court
United States Supreme Court cases